Reckahn Solar Park is a photovoltaic power station in Reckahn, southwest of Berlin, Germany. It has a capacity of 37.7 megawatt (MW) and was constructed in three phases. Reckahn I was 22.661 MW covering  and was built by Beck Energy GmbH (Belectric) using 292,000 First Solar thin-film CdTe-panels, and was expected to produce about 22 gigawatt-hours per year. Reckahn II added 13.3 MW, using 172,000 modules on a  site. Reckahn III, completed in 2011, added 1.8 MW, bringing the total to 37.7 MW. The FIT is 21.1 Euro cents per kilowatt-hour.

See also

PV system
List of photovoltaic power stations
Solar power in Germany
Electricity sector in Germany

References

Photovoltaic power stations in Germany
Economy of Brandenburg